Bernstorff Glacier (also referred to as A.P. Bernstorf Gletscher), is a glacier in the King Frederick VI Coast, Sermersooq, southeastern Greenland. 

Like the fjord, this glacier was named after Danish statesman Andreas Peter Bernstorff.

Geography 
The Bernstorff Glacier is a fast-flowing glacier originating in the eastern side of the Greenland Ice Sheet. It flows roughly south/southeastward and is joined by a branch flowing from the north with the confluence west of Alfheimbjerg. Its terminus is in the Bernstorff Fjord (Kangertittivaq), slightly to the west of the terminus of the Fimbul Glacier and to the north of the Storebjørn Glacier. Together the Bernstorff and Fimbul glaciers produce massive amounts of ice that blocks the fjord.

Bibliography
Climate-related glacier fluctuations in southeast Greenland

See also
List of glaciers in Greenland

References

External links
Southeast Greenland glaciers to warm Atlantic Water from Operation IceBridge and Ocean Melting Greenland data - ResearchGate
Figure S45. AP Bernstorff Glacier
NASA - Small glacier emptying into the fjord of the much large Bernstorff Glacier
Glaciers of Greenland
Sermersooq